Faja Lobbi is a 1960 Dutch-Surinamese award-winning documentary film, directed by Herman van der Horst. Its alternative titles include Fiery Love en Symphony of the Tropics and it was shown at the Film Festivals in Berlin and Adelaide.

External links 
 

1960 films
Dutch documentary films
1960s Dutch-language films
Surinamese documentary films
Films set in Suriname
Films shot in Suriname
1960 documentary films